Lamarckiana is a genus of grasshoppers in the family Pamphagidae. There are about five described species in Lamarckiana, found in southern and eastern Africa.

Species
These five species belong to the genus Lamarckiana:
 Lamarckiana bolivariana (Saussure, 1887)
 Lamarckiana cucullata (Stoll, 1813)
 Lamarckiana nasuta (Saussure, 1887)
 Lamarckiana punctosa (Walker, 1870)
 Lamarckiana sparrmani (Stål, 1876)

References

Pamphagidae